Mozang Chungi or Mozang is an area in Lahore, Pakistan. Nearby areas are Jail Road, Choubarji, Shama and famous Anarkali Bazar. It is located at 31°32'55N 74°18'54E. The area came under attention after the controversial Raymond Allen Davis incident took place here.

References

Data Gunj Bakhsh Zone